Edwin Mauricio Chalar Granja (born 21 April 1987) is a Colombian football striker who plays for Cienciano in Peru.

He has played for the Colombian U-20 national football team (2007). On club level he plays for Atlético Bucaramanga in the Copa Mustang.

After the Sudamericana sub 20 2007 in Paraguay where he was a starter for the Colombian sub 20. He was transferred to Newell's Old Boys where he appeared in only four league matches before returning to Colombia to play for Atlético Bucaramanga.

References

External links 
  BDFA profile

1987 births
Living people
Colombian footballers
Colombia under-20 international footballers
Colombian expatriate footballers
Expatriate footballers in Ecuador
Expatriate footballers in Venezuela
Expatriate footballers in Argentina
Atlético Huila footballers
C.D. Quevedo footballers
Manta F.C. footballers
Envigado F.C. players
Newell's Old Boys footballers
Atlético Bucaramanga footballers
C.S.D. Macará footballers
Cúcuta Deportivo footballers
Asociación Civil Deportivo Lara players
Yaracuyanos FC players
Argentine Primera División players
Categoría Primera A players
Association football forwards
Sportspeople from Valle del Cauca Department